Kang Kum-Sil (born February 12, 1957) is a South Korean politician and a lawyer, and also served as the Minister of Justice from February 2003 to July 2004. She was the ruling Uri Party Mayoral candidate of Seoul Metropolitan City (lost to Oh Se-hoon of Grand National Party), and is a graduate of Seoul National University with a degree in Law.

External links
 Official Site 

1957 births
Living people
Seoul National University School of Law alumni
20th-century South Korean lawyers
South Korean women lawyers
Justice ministers of South Korea
Uri Party politicians
Female justice ministers
21st-century South Korean women politicians
21st-century South Korean politicians
South Korean feminists
Women government ministers of South Korea
South Korean women judges